Open Letters Monthly or Open Letters Monthly: an Arts and Literature Review, was an online arts and culture magazine. It was founded in 2007 by Sam Sacks, John Cotter, and Steve Donoghue, and published its last issue in 2017. It features long-form criticism of books, films, and art exhibits as well as original artwork and poetry.

Critical reception
In 2007, M. A. Orthofer of the complete review called Open Letters Monthly "the best new on-line literary periodical out there." In 2010, blogger, author, and critic Maud Newton noted that "Open Letters has been doing really great stuff for a long time."  Daniel E. Pritchard of The Critical Flame describes that the Open Letters Monthly "presents a primer on some of the best internet reviews and criticism available."

Notes

References
Macy Halford, "They Are Not Haunted, and They Will Not Haunt Us." Book Bench, The New Yorker, October 1, 2009.
Mark Athitakis, Conversations with Literary Websites: Open Letters Monthly, National Book Critics Circle, July 8, 2010.

External links
Open Letters Monthly, official site
Open Letters Monthly, Facebook page

American literature websites